William Conrad (born John William Cann Jr., September 27, 1920 – February 11, 1994) was an American actor, producer, and director whose entertainment career spanned five decades in radio, film, and television, peaking in popularity when he starred in the detective series Cannon.

A radio writer and actor, he moved to Hollywood after serving in World War II as a fighter pilot, and played a series of character roles in films, beginning with the film noir The Killers (1946). He created the role of Marshal Matt Dillon for the radio series Gunsmoke (1952–1961) and narrated the television adventures of Rocky and Bullwinkle (1959–1964) and The Fugitive (1963–1967).

Finding fewer onscreen roles in the 1950s, he changed from actor to producer-director with television work, narration, and a series of Warner Bros. films in the 1960s. Conrad found stardom as a detective in the TV series Cannon (1971–1976) and Nero Wolfe (1981), and as district attorney Jason Lochinvar "J.L., Fatman" McCabe in the legal drama Jake and the Fatman (1987–1992).

Early life
William Conrad (also known as John William Conrad) was born John William Cann Jr., on September 27, 1920, in Louisville, Kentucky. His parents, John William Cann and Ida Mae Upchurch Cann, owned a movie theatre, and Conrad grew up watching movies. The family moved to Southern California when Conrad was in high school. He majored in drama and literature at Fullerton College, in Orange County, California, and began his career as an announcer, writer, and director for Los Angeles radio station KMPC.

Conrad served as a fighter pilot in World War II. On the day he was commissioned in 1943 at Luke Field, he married June Nelson (1920–1977) of Los Angeles. He left the United States Army Air Forces with the rank of captain and as a producer-director of the Armed Forces Radio Service.

Career

Radio
William Conrad estimated that he played more than 7,500 roles during his radio career. At KMPC, the 22-year-old Conrad produced and acted in The Hermit's Cave (circa 1940–44), the Los Angeles incarnation of a popular syndicated horror anthology series created at WJR Detroit.

He was among the supporting cast for the espionage drama The Man Called X (1944–48); the syndicated dramatic anthology Favorite Story (1946–49); the adventure dramas The Count of Monte Cristo (Mutual 1947–48), The Voyage of the Scarlet Queen (Mutual 1947–48), The Green Lama (CBS 1949), and Night Beat (NBC 1950–52); Romance (1950); Hollywood Star Playhouse (1950–53); Errol Flynn's The Modern Adventures of Casanova (Mutual 1952); and Cathy and Elliott Lewis's On Stage (CBS 1953–54).

Conrad was the voice of Escape (1947–54), a high-adventure radio series. He played Warchek, a menacing policeman, in Johnny Modero: Pier 23 (Mutual 1947), a detective series starring Jack Webb, and was in the cast of Webb's crime drama Pete Kelly's Blues (NBC 1951). He played newspaper editor Walter Burns opposite Dick Powell's reporter Hildy Johnson in the ABC radio drama The Front Page (1948). He was Dave the Dude in the syndicated drama anthology series The Damon Runyon Theater (1948); Lt. Dundy in the NBC radio series The Adventures of Sam Spade (1949–50); boss to government special agent Douglas Fairbanks Jr. in The Silent Men (NBC 1951); and a New Orleans bartender in the NBC adventure drama Jason and the Golden Fleece (1952–53).

Most prominently, Conrad's deep, resonant voice was heard in the role of Marshal Matt Dillon on CBS Radio's gritty Western series Gunsmoke (1952–1961). The producers originally rejected him for the part because of his ubiquitous presence on so many radio dramas and the familiarity of his voice, but his impressive audition could not be dismissed, and he became the obvious choice for the role. Conrad voiced Dillon for the show's nine-year run, and he wrote the June 1953 episode "Sundown". When Gunsmoke was adapted for television in 1955, executives at CBS did not cast Conrad or his radio costars despite a campaign to get them to change their minds.

His other credits include Suspense, Lux Radio Theater, and Fibber McGee and Molly. In "The Wax Works", a 1956 episode of Suspense, Conrad performed every part. Because of his CBS Radio contract, he sometimes appeared on shows on other networks under the pseudonym "Julius Krelboyne".

In January 1956, Conrad was the announcer on the debut broadcast of The CBS Radio Workshop, a two-part adaptation of Aldous Huxley's Brave New World, which Huxley himself narrated. "On the air, The CBS Radio Workshop was a lightning rod for ideas," wrote radio historian John Dunning, who cites Conrad's tour de force performances in the subsequent broadcasts "The Legend of Jimmy Blue Eyes" (March 23, 1956) and "A Matter of Logic" (June 1, 1956). Conrad directed and narrated the 1957 episode "Epitaphs", an adaptation of Edgar Lee Masters's poetry volume Spoon River Anthology.

"And '1489 Words' (Feb. 10, 1957) remains a favorite of many, a powerful Conrad performance proving that one picture is not necessarily worth a thousand words," Dunning concluded. "A lovely way to end a day, a decade, or an era."

Film

As an actor in feature films, Conrad was often cast as a threatening figure. His most notable role may be the first for which he was credited, as one of the gunmen sent to eliminate Burt Lancaster in The Killers (1946). Conrad also appeared in Body and Soul (1947), Sorry, Wrong Number (1948), Joan of Arc (1948), and The Naked Jungle (1954).

In 1961, Conrad moved to the production side of the film business, producing and directing for Warner Bros. film studio.  In 1965 he produced and directed Two on a Guillotine, My Blood Runs Cold and Brainstorm as well as narrating the opening of Battle of the Bulge. Brainstorm was a latter-day film noir that has come to be regarded as "a minor masterpiece of the 1960s" and "the final, essential entry in that long line of films noir that begins at the end of the Second World War." 

Conrad was the executive producer of Countdown (1968), a science-fiction thriller starring James Caan and Robert Duvall that was the major studio feature début of director Robert Altman.

Conrad narrated the documentary Design For Disaster, produced by the Los Angeles City Fire Department, about the November 1961 Bel Air wildfire that gutted several neighborhoods, at the time the worst conflagration in Los Angeles history.
 
As a token of appreciation from Jack L. Warner, head of Warner Bros., Conrad received one of the two original lead-metal falcon statues used in the classic film The Maltese Falcon (1941). The falcon sat on a bookshelf in Conrad's house from the 1960s. Standing 11.5 in (29.2 cm) high and weighing 45 lb (20.4 kg), the figurine had been slashed during the making of the film by Sydney Greenstreet's character Kasper Gutman, leaving deep cuts in its bronze patina. After Conrad's death, the statue was consigned by his widow Tippy Conrad to Christie's, which estimated it would bring $30,000 to $50,000 at auction. In December 1994, Christie's sold the falcon for $398,500. The purchaser was Ronald Winston, president of Harry Winston, Inc. jewelers. In 1996, Winston resold the prop to an unknown European collector "at an enormous profit"for as much as $1 million.

Late in life, Conrad narrated the opening and closing scenes of the 1991 Bruce Willis feature film Hudson Hawk.

Television

Voice
As "Bill Conrad", he narrated the animated Rocky and Bullwinkle series from 1959 to 1964. He narrated This Man Dawson, a 33-episode syndicated crime drama starring Keith Andes in the 1959–1960 television season, and then became the familiar voice narrating The Fugitive, starring David Janssen, on ABC television from 1963 to 1967. He could also be heard introducing Count Basie's Orchestra and Frank Sinatra on Sinatra's 1966 Live at the Sands album.

Conrad intoned a rhyming narration heard over the credits of the 1970 John Wayne film Western Chisum. His voice is heard in the Clio Award-winning 1971 public-service announcement about pollution featuring Iron Eyes Cody, created for Earth Day by Keep America Beautiful and the Ad Council. From 1973 to 1978, Conrad narrated the TV nature program, Wild, Wild World of Animals. Also during the 1970s, he appeared in and narrated a number of episodes for ABC's American Sportsman, and in the CBS documentary The Lost Treasure of the Concepcion.  He later narrated The Making of Star Wars (1977), the disaster documentary Catastrophe! (1977), the 1978 World Series U.S.-baseball highlight film, Buck Rogers in the 25th Century (1979), and The Rebels (1979). He performed the role of Denethor in the 1980 animated TV version of J. R. R. Tolkien's The Return of the King. His other voice work included narration for The Highwayman and the High Flight sign-off featuring an F-15.

Directing
Conrad directed episodes of NBC's Klondike in the 1960–1961 season. His other credits as a director include episodes of The Rifleman, Bat Masterson, Route 66, Have Gun – Will Travel, 77 Sunset Strip, Temple Houstonand Ripcord, as well as ABC's crime drama Target: The Corruptors!.

Acting

Conrad guest-starred in NBC's science-fiction series The Man and the Challenge and in the syndicated skydiving adventure series Ripcord, with Larry Pennell and Ken Curtis. In 1962, he starred in an episode of The Alfred Hitchcock Hour and guest-starred in episodes of ABC's crime drama Target: The Corruptors!.

From 1971 to 1976, he starred in television detective series Cannon, which was broadcast on CBS.

"I heard that Weight Watchers had banned its members from watching the show, but it turned out to be a gag," Conrad said in 1973. "The publicist for Weight Watchers did call and suggest that I have lunch with their president. I said sure – if I could pick the restaurant."

From the early 1980s to the early 1990s, he starred in two other TV series, each with a crime detection/courtroom drama theme – Nero Wolfe (1981) and Jake and the Fatman (1987–92) with Joe Penny.

Hosting
Throughout the 1970s and into the 1980s, Conrad served as the armchair-and-fireside host of the CBS All American Thanksgiving Day Parade morning broadcasts in which he anchored the network's annual holiday telecast of parades from around the U.S. and Canada, including parades from Detroit, Hawaii, New York City, Philadelphia, and Toronto.

Other appearances 
In the 1970s and 1980s, Conrad appeared in a few Pittway First Alert Smoke Alarm commercials as the host, explaining the need for the alarms.

Later life
In 1957, Conrad was married to former fashion model Susan Randall (1940–1979), and the couple had one son, Christopher. In 1980, Conrad married Tipton "Tippy" Stringer (1930–2010), a TV pioneer and the widow of NBC newscaster Chet Huntley. She helped manage his career during their 14-year marriage.

Hobbies
Conrad was an avid outdoorsman and accomplished fisherman. Having been known for his prowess using light tackle, as documented in the magazine Field & Stream, on May 23, 1972, in the Yucatan Channel of Mexico, Conrad caught a 62 lb, 4 oz sailfish on thread-like 6-lb-test line.

Death
William Conrad died of a heart attack at age 73 in Los Angeles on February 11, 1994. He was buried in the Lincoln Terrace section of Forest Lawn, Hollywood Hills Cemetery, California.

Recognition
Conrad was posthumously elected to the National Radio Hall of Fame in 1997, and also to the Broadcasting and Cable Hall of Fame.

Filmography

Actor

Director

Producer

References

External links

William Conrad at Turner Classic Movies
William Conrad at the National Radio Hall of Fame
 
 

1920 births
1994 deaths
20th-century American male actors
American World War II fighter pilots
American film producers
American male film actors
American male radio actors
American male television actors
American male voice actors
American television directors
American television producers
Burials at Forest Lawn Memorial Park (Hollywood Hills)
Film directors from Kentucky
Male Western (genre) film actors
Male actors from Louisville, Kentucky
Military personnel from Louisville, Kentucky
Nero Wolfe
Radio personalities from Louisville, Kentucky
United States Army Air Forces officers
United States Army Air Forces pilots of World War II